McTeague: A Story of San Francisco, otherwise known as simply McTeague, is a novel by Frank Norris, first published in 1899.  It tells the story of a couple's courtship and marriage, and their subsequent descent into poverty and violence as the result of jealousy and greed. The book was the basis for the films McTeague (1916) and Erich von Stroheim's Greed (1924). It was also adapted as an opera by William Bolcom in 1992.

Plot summary
McTeague is a dentist of limited intellect from a poor miner's family, who has opened a dentist shop on Polk Street in San Francisco (his first name is never revealed; other characters in the novel call him simply "Mac."). His best friend, Marcus Schouler, brings his cousin, Trina Sieppe, whom he is courting, to McTeague's parlor for dental work. McTeague becomes infatuated with Trina while working on her teeth, and Marcus graciously steps aside. McTeague successfully woos Trina. Shortly after the two have kissed and declared their love for each other, Trina discovers that she has won $5,000 (roughly $166,000 in 2022 values) from a lottery ticket. In the ensuing celebration Trina's mother, Mrs. Sieppe, announces that McTeague and Trina are to marry. Marcus becomes jealous of McTeague and claims that he has been cheated out of money that would have been rightfully his if he had married Trina.

The marriage takes place, and Mrs. Sieppe, along with the rest of Trina's family, moves away from San Francisco, leaving her alone with McTeague. Trina proves to be a parsimonious wife; she refuses to touch the principal of her $5,000, which she invests with her uncle. She insists that she and McTeague must live on the earnings from McTeague's dental practice, the small income from the $5,000 investment, and the bit of money she earns from carving small wooden figures of Noah's animals and his Ark for sale in her uncle's shop. Secretly, she accumulates penny-pinched savings in a locked trunk. Though the couple is happy, the friendship between Marcus and McTeague deteriorates. More than once the two men come to grips; each time McTeague's immense physical strength prevails, and eventually, he breaks Marcus's arm in a fight. When Marcus recovers, he goes south, intending to become a rancher; before he leaves, he visits McTeague, and he and McTeague part apparently as friends.

Catastrophe strikes when McTeague is debarred from practicing dentistry by the authorities. It becomes clear that before leaving, Marcus has taken revenge on Mac by informing city hall that he has no license or academic degree. McTeague loses his practice and the couple is forced to move into successively poorer quarters, as Trina becomes more and more miserly. Their life together deteriorates, with McTeague escalating in his abuse until he steals all of Trina's domestic savings (amounting to $400 or roughly $13,000 in 2022 values) and abandons her. Meanwhile, Trina falls completely under the spell of money and withdraws the principal of her prior winnings in gold from her uncle's firm so she can admire and handle the coins in her room, at one point spreading them over her bed and rolling around in them.

When McTeague returns, destitute once more, Trina refuses to give him money even for food. McTeague beats her to death. He takes the entire hoard of gold and heads out to a mining community that he had left years before. Sensing pursuit, he makes his way south towards Mexico. Meanwhile, Marcus hears of the murder and joins the hunt for McTeague, finally catching him in Death Valley. In the middle of the desert, Marcus and McTeague fight over McTeague's remaining water and, when that runs out, over Trina's $5,000. McTeague kills Marcus, but as he dies, Marcus handcuffs himself to McTeague. The final, dramatic image of the novel is one of McTeague stranded, alone, and helpless. He is left with only the company of Marcus's corpse, to whom he is handcuffed, in the desolate, arid waste of Death Valley.

Adaptations

 McTeague (also known as Life's Whirlpool) starring Holbrook Blinn and Fania Marinoff was released in 1916. It is considered a lost film.
 Greed, Erich von Stroheim's film version of McTeague, was made in 1924. In its original form, it lasted approximately eight hours but was cut drastically by the studio, MGM, and most of the excised footage has been lost.
 Karen Kearns produced a radio drama version of McTeague in 1989, under a fellowship for the Corporation for Public Broadcasting. The program features Stacy Keach, Carol Kane, Hector Elizondo, JoBeth Williams, Michael York, Katherine Helmond, Ed Asner, Joe Spano, and many other well-known actors.
 McTeague was the basis of an opera of the same name by composer William Bolcom and librettist Arnold Weinstein, which premiered on October 31, 1992.
 Greedy is a 1994 American comedy film directed by Jonathan Lynn and written by Lowell Ganz and Babaloo Mandel. The film stars Michael J. Fox, Kirk Douglas, and Nancy Travis, with Phil Hartman, Ed Begley Jr., Olivia d'Abo, Colleen Camp, and Bob Balaban appearing in supporting roles. The original music score was composed by Randy Edelman. It is a very loose adaptation of McTeague. 
 Slow Burn is a 2000 drama film directed by Christian Ford and starring Minnie Driver, James Spader, Stuart Wilson, and Josh Brolin. It is a very loose adaptation of McTeague.

Further reading

 Bender, Bert (1999). "Frank Norris on the Evolution and Repression of the Sexual Instinct," Nineteenth-Century Literature, Vol. 54, No. 1, pp. 73–103.
 Campbell, Donna M. (1993). "Frank Norris' 'Drama of a Broken Teacup': The Old Grannis-Miss Baker Plot in McTeague," American Literary Realism, 1870–1910, Vol. XXVI, No. 1, pp. 40–49.
 Collins, Carvel (1950). "Introduction" to McTeague. New York: Rinehart.
 Cowley, Malcolm (1947). "Naturalism's Terrible McTeague," New Republic, Vol. CXVI, p. 31–33.
 Dillingham, W.B. (1977). "The Old Folks of McTeague." In: Donald Pizer (ed.), McTeague. New York: Norton.
 Freedman, William (1980). "Oral Passivity and Oral Sadism in Norris's McTeague," Literature and Psychology, Vol. XXX, pp. 52–61.
 Graham, Don (1980). "Art in McTeague." In: Critical Essays on Frank Norris. Boston: G.K. Hall and Co., pp. 75–84.
 Hochman, Barbara (1986). "Loss, Habit, Obsession: The Governing Dynamic of McTeague," Studies in American Fiction, Vol. XIV, No. 2, pp. 179–190.
 Hug, William J. (1991). "McTeague as Metafiction? Frank Norris' Parodies of Bret Harte and the Dime Novel," Western American Literature, Vol. 26, No. 3, pp. 219–228. 
 Kaplan, Charles (1954). "Fact into Fiction in McTeague," Harvard Library Bulletin, Vol. VIII, pp. 381–385.
 Lardy, Leonard Anthony (1959). "McTeague: A Study in Determinism, Romanticism and Fascism," (M.A. Thesis) Montana State University.
 Litton, Alfred G. (1991). "The Kinetoscope in McTeague: 'The Crowning Scientific Achievement of the Nineteenth Century'," Studies in American Fiction, Vol. 19, No. 1, pp. 107–712. 
 Mahin, Sarah Jane (1944). Formative Influences on Frank Norris's Novel McTeague. (M.A. Thesis), University of Iowa.
 McElrath, Jr., Joseph R. (1975). "The Comedy of Frank Norris's McTeague," Studies in American Humor, Vol. II, No. 2, pp. 88–95.
 Miller, Edwin Haviland (1979). "The Art of Frank Norris in McTeague," Markham Review, Vol. VIII, pp. 61–65.
 Morris, Ethiel Virginia (1928). Frank Norris' Trilogy on American Life. (M.A. Thesis), University of Kansas.
 Johnson, George W. (1962). "The Frontier behind Frank Norris' McTeague," Huntington Library Quarterly, Vol. XXVI, No. 1, pp. 91–104.
 Pizer, Donald (1997). "The Biological Determinism of McTeague in Our Time," American Literary Realism, Vol. 29, No. 2, pp. 27–33 
 Shroeder, John (1981). "The Shakespearean Plots of 'Mcteague'," American Literary Realism, 1870–1910, Vol. XIV, No. 2, pp. 289–296.
 Spangler, George M. (1978). "The Structure of McTeague," English Studies, Vol. LIX, pp. 48–56. 
 Ware, Thomas C. (1981). "'Gold to Airy Thinness Beat': The Midas Touch in Frank Norris's McTeague," Interpretations, Vol. XIII, No. 1, pp. 39–47.

External links

 
  (plain text)
 
 McTeague at Internet Archive (scanned books)
 McTeague at Hathi Trust (scanned books)

1899 American novels
American novels adapted into films
Novels set in San Francisco
Novels by Frank Norris
Doubleday & McClure Company books
Fictional dentists
Novels adapted into operas
Uxoricide in fiction